The 79th Medical Wing was the United States Air Force's agent for Air Force and joint medicine within the National Capital Region. Activated on 10 May 2006, it was the largest wing within the Air Force District of Washington, and one of two medical wings in the Air Force.  The wing was originally active as an infirmary at Youngstown Municipal Airport between 1955 and 1960.

The 79th Medical Wing was headquartered at Malcolm Grow Medical Clinics and Surgery Center. The wing organized, trained, equipped, and provided medicine for Air and Space Expeditionary Force deployment, CONUS operations, and in support of joint operations within the National Capital Region. It was the East Coast hub for aeromedical evacuation aircraft returning sick or injured patients from the Atlantic area. The wing was also responsible for providing medical support to Presidential, Congressional, Joint and Air Staff special airlift missions.

The 79th Medical Wing was inactivated, and its personnel, equipment, and facilities transferred to the 11th Medical Group, a component of the 11th Wing, on 16 June 2017.

Air Defense Command 1955-1960
The wing was first organized in August 1955 as the 79th USAF Infirmary at Youngstown Municipal Airport when the 79th Fighter Group was activated to replace the 502d Air Defense Group as part of Air Defense Command's Project Arrow, a program to restore fighter units that had compiled memorable records in the two world wars.   The unit absorbed the personnel and equipment of the 502d USAF Infirmary.

In May 1957, the unit became the 79th USAF Dispensary, when the Air Force renamed its small medical units.  The dispensary was discontinued along with the 79th Group in March 1960, when the ADC turned its facilities at Youngstown over to Continental Air Command for use as a reserve station.

Predecessors at Andrews
The wing started as a medical detachment consisting of one officer (Capt. Isadore L. Epstein) and 11 enlisted men, who reported to Camp Springs and set up a dispensary. The dispensary had an eight-bed ward, two private rooms, a pharmacy, a dental clinic with two chairs, an X-ray machine, a kitchenette, and offices. Five ambulances were available and Walter Reed General Hospital and Bolling Field Station Hospital were used for consultation and emergencies.

Named after Maj. Gen. (Dr.) Malcolm Grow in 1962, the center was dedicated to a man who served as a field doctor in both world wars, in 1949 was selected at the first Air Force surgeon general, and was active in military medicine until his death in 1960.

Originally named the USAF Hospital Andrews, construction began in June 1955 and was completed in May 1958 to the tune of $5.5 million. Staffed by Bolling and Andrews personnel, the facility opened 4 August 1958 and provided care to more than 75,000 area military personnel and their families.  The dispensary was redesignated the 79th Medical Wing and activated to manage the facility in May 2006.

Today, more than 600,000 eligible Department of Defense beneficiaries are in the National Capital Region.  On a typical day in patient care, Malcolm Grow Medical Clinics and Surgery Center doctors and other healthcare workers see 930 outpatients, 90 dental patients, and 72 emergent care patients, and conduct seven surgical procedures, take care of 30 patients transitioning at the Aeromedical Staging Facility, and fill 1,963 pharmacy prescriptions.  The wing was inactivated in June 2017, and facility management was transferred to the 11th Medical Group, which was simultaneously activated.

Lineage
 Constituted as the 79th USAF Infirmary on 20 June 1955
 Activated on 18 August 1955
 Redesignated 79th USAF Dispensary on 8 May 1957
 Discontinued on 1 March 1960
 Redesignated 79th Medical Wing on 5 May 2006
 Activated on 10 May 2006
 Inactivated June 2017

Assignments
 79th Fighter Group, 18 August 1955 – 1 March 1960
 Air Force District of Washington, 10 May 2006 – June 2017

Components
 79th Medical Group, 5 May 2006 – 1 October 2008
 579th Medical Group, 10 May 2006 – June 2017
 779th Medical Group, 1 October 2008 – June 2017

Stations
 Youngstown Municipal Airport, Ohio 18 August 1955 – 1 March 1960
 Andrews Air Force Base, Maryland, 10 May 2006 – June 2017

Notes

Bibliography
 Buss, Lydus H.(ed), Sturm, Thomas A., Volan, Denys, and McMullen, Richard F., History of Continental Air Defense Command and Air Defense Command July to December 1955, Directorate of Historical Services, Air Defense Command, Ent AFB, CO, (1956)

External links

 79th Medical Wing Fact Sheet

This article contains information that originally came from a US Government website, in the public domain.

0079
Military units and formations in Maryland
Military units and formations established in 2006